Cheilosia vernalis is a Palearctic hoverfly.

Description
For terms see Morphology of Diptera  
The upper margin of the facial tubercle is smooth. The eyes have short black hairs. The post-alar calli and the margin of the scutellum have only short bristles. The normal length wings are usually hyaline. The wing length is 4 ·5-6·75 mm.,body length is 5.0 to 7.0mm.A very variable species.
See references for determination.

Distribution
Scandinavia south to the Iberian Peninsula and from Ireland eastwards through central and southern Europe to Turkey', European parts of Russia, Russian Far East and Siberia.

Habitat
Very varied. Forest, pasture, montane grassland, alpine grassland, fen and dune systems.

Biology
Low-flying, over ground vegetation; males hover at 1-3m, in small clearings.
Flowers visited include Caltha, Cirsium arvense, Leontodon, Leucanthemum, Menyanthes, 
Prunus spinosa, Ranunculus, Salix, Senecio, Taraxacum. Flies April to October The larva feedsin the stems of Achillea,
Matricaria and Sonchus oleraceus and in the involucre of Tragopogon

References

Diptera of Europe
Eristalinae
Insects described in 1838
Taxa named by Carl Fredrik Fallén